John Freudenberg (born November 12, 1969) is an American attorney and Associate Justice of the Nebraska Supreme Court.

Early life, education, and legal career

Freudenberg attended Chadron State College for his undergraduate degree and the University of Nebraska College of Law for his Juris Doctor He worked as a county attorney and later as Nebraska Assistant Attorney General. From 2007 to 2017, he was the Special Assistant United States Attorney for the District of Nebraska. He was appointed as a Lancaster County Judge in 2017.

Nebraska Supreme Court tenure
Freudenberg was one of three finalists named for the vacancy. On June 18, 2018 Governor Pete Ricketts announced the appointment of Freudenberg the state Supreme Court. He fills the seat vacated due to the death of Associate Justice John F. Wright.  This is Governor Ricketts’ fifth appointment to the Nebraska Supreme Court.

References

External links

Living people
1969 births
21st-century American judges
Justices of the Nebraska Supreme Court
Chadron State College alumni
University of Nebraska alumni
Assistant United States Attorneys